A specialty registrar (StR) is a doctor, public health practitioner  or dentist who is working as part of a specialty training programme in the UK. This is known as a training grade as these doctors are supervised to an extent, as part of a structured training experience that leads to being able to undertake independent practice in a hospital specialty or working as a general practitioner.

This training grade was introduced into UK postgraduate medical training in 2007 as part of the Modernising Medical Careers programme with the specialty registrar training places being created instead of the Senior House Officer (SHO) and Specialist registrar (SpR) posts.

Background
In the UK medical system, a specialist is someone who has the necessary experience and qualifications to be placed on the GMC's Specialist Register. Only persons on the Specialist Register can be appointed consultants in the National Health Service (NHS). Training to become a General Practitioner will also involve a Specialty Registrar training scheme and completion will lead to eligibility for entry on the General Practice Register.

Doctors can enter this training grade after completing their foundation training, but need to go through a competitive process of entry into specialty training schemes. Completing the training scheme will lead to the award of a Certificate of Completion of Training (CCT), subject to satisfactory in-training assessment and progress; this is a necessary pre-requisite for entry onto the Specialist Register  or GP Register. From 10 May 2013, fees paid by trainees are an allowable tax deduction from employment income, or alternatively are not liable to tax and national insurance as a benefit if paid by the employer.

Specialty Training programmes vary in length and are tailored to the needs of the specialty. The curricula used for the different specialty training schemes are set by the relevant medical royal college. Under the old system, before applying for the old Registrar posts, applicants were required to have sat and passed part, or all, of a medical royal college's membership examinations while still a Senior House Officer. Under the new system Foundation doctors do not need to sit these exams as they play no part in the selection process and are discouraged from doing so.  It is, however, still common practice to begin to take these exams during the second year of the foundation programme and is recommended by experts outside MMC. The appropriate royal college exams will now be taken during the first year or two of the Specialty Registrar training scheme.

See also 
 Medical specialist
 Federation of National Specialty Societies of Canada

References

External links
NHS Careers website
Modernising Medical Careers website
Modernising Medical Careers - publication by the Department of Health
Medical Training Application Service

Healthcare occupations in the United Kingdom